,  is a Buddhist temple belonging to the Myōshin-ji branch of the Rinzai school of Japanese Zen, located in the Okitsu neighborhood of Shimizu-ku ward of the city of Shizuoka, Shizuoka, Japan. Its main image is a statue of Shaka Nyōrai. It is also called Kiyomi-dera.

History
The temple subsequently fell into disrepair and was revived and converted to the Rinzai school by the monk Enni in 1262 AD. The temple flourished during the Muromachi period and was named one of the Jissetsu temples in 1343. It is where Ashikaga Takauji and Imagawa Yoshimoto took the tonsure. In the Sengoku period, when the young Tokugawa Ieyasu was held hostage in Sunpu by the Imagawa clan, he was sent to Seiken-ji to be tutored by the abbot Sessai Chōrō. During the invasion of Suruga Province by the Takeda clan, Imagawa Ujizane established his headquarters at this temple.

During the Edo period, the temple continued to flourish due to its connection with Tokugawa Ieyasu, and its location on the Tōkaidō highway linking Edo with Kyoto. It was selected by the Tokugawa shogunate as one of the lodging spots for the Joseon missions to Japan and the delegations from the Ryukyu Kingdom.  Due to these connections it was designated a National Historic Site of Japan in 1994. Surviving Edo period structures include the Sanmon (1651) and entrance to the Main Hall (1616).

During the early Meiji period, the tracks of the Tōkaidō Main Line railway were laid across the front of the temple, which lost much of its properties. However, due to its scenic location overlooking Suruga Bay, the temple drew the attention of poets and writers, including Shimazaki Tōson, Takayama Chogyū and Natsume Sōseki.

The temple was also the location of an important conference held by the leadership of the fledgling Imperial Japanese Navy in June 1887, with the participants discussing various tactics and fleet maneuvers, which would then be tested in practice by the fleet in nearby Shimizu harbor.

Cultural properties

National Important Cultural Properties

Diary of Ye Mengde
Diary of Ye Mengde (1077–1148), a Song dynasty Chinese scholar, poet, and government minister, dated summer of 1149 AD

National Place of Scenic Beauty

Seiken-ji gardens
The Japanese garden at Seiken-ji dates from the early Edo period and contains ponds and tree arrangements. It became a nationally designated Place of Scenic Beauty in 1936.

Gallery

See also
List of Historic Sites of Japan (Shizuoka)
List of Places of Scenic Beauty of Japan (Shizuoka)

References

External links

Buddhist temples in Shizuoka Prefecture
Myoshin-ji temples
Shizuoka (city)
Suruga Province
Important Cultural Properties of Japan
Places of Scenic Beauty
Historic Sites of Japan